She's the One may refer to:

 She's the One (1996 film), an American 1996 comedy-drama film
 Songs and Music from "She's the One", ninth studio album by Tom Petty and the Heartbreakers and soundtrack to the above film
 She's the One (2013 film), a 2013 Filipino romantic-comedy film
 "She's the One" (Bruce Springsteen song), 1975
 "She's the One" (Hank Ballard song), a 1955 song covered by James Brown in 1988
 "She's the One" (The Cockroaches song) a 1987 single by the Australian music group The Cockroaches
 "She's the One" (World Party song), a 1997 song covered by Robbie Williams in 1999
 "She's the One", a song by the Ramones from the 1978 album Road to Ruin
 "She's the One", a 1964 Top 40 hit for The Chartbusters
 She's the One, a song by Roy Harper, included on some versions of his Come Out Fighting Ghengis Smith album
 She's the One, a 2004 television special show for the Irish band Westlife
 "She's The One" a song by Juice WRLD from his album Death Race for Love